Mel's Drive-In is a term referring to two American restaurant chains, successors of a restaurant founded in 1947 by Mel Weiss and Harold Dobbs in San Francisco, California. It is closely associated with the film American Graffiti.

Locations and naming

There are a number of Mel's in Northern California that share the same general American Graffiti nostalgia theme and the similarly styled Mel's logo. These restaurants are called “Original Mels”. Their locations are not listed on the official Mel's Drive-In website but they have their own website, although an article from the Sacramento Business Journal shows that they're related.

A family rift caused the Weisses to part ways and form two chains. The elder Weiss sold his company to Larry Spergel in 1994, who formed a group of about 50 stockholders that now owns the chain. The Walnut Creek, California, location features a history of the original San Francisco Mel's.

Some Mel's Drive-In locations are not actually drive-ins, but rather diners. For example, while founded in San Francisco, none of the locations in the city currently serve food to patrons’ cars.

Signage and menus on the original Mel's Diners did not have a possessive apostrophe in the name, as would be expected. However, when Universal Studios recreated the diners at their theme parks in Hollywood, Orlando, Japan, Beijing, and Singapore, they opted to include the apostrophe in all Mel's Drive-In signage, literature, and media.

After the last original Mel's closed in the 1970s, Mel Weiss's son Steven Weiss and partner Donald Wagstaff opened the first of a next generation of Mel's Drive-In restaurants in 1985. As of 2020, there are 7 Mel's drive-in locations in Northern and Southern California and one Mel's Kitchen.

One location near downtown San Francisco, rechristened Mel's Kitchen, has gone upscale, serving $12 cocktails, $16 burgers with locally sourced beef, ahi poke, acai smoothies, and avocado toast.  That site was almost demolished to build housing.

Southern California locations 

All four Mel's Drive-In locations in Southern California are housed in historic buildings. Mel's Drive-In at 14846 Ventura Blvd in the Sherman Oaks neighborhood of Los Angeles, California was built as Kerry's coffee shop in 1953. The googie style building was designed by Armet & Davis. Mel's Drive-In at 8585 Sunset Boulevard in West Hollywood, California was built as Ben Frank's in 1962. The googie style building was designed by Lane & Schlick. Mel's Drive-In at 1660 N. Highland Avenue in Hollywood, California is located in a portion of the former Max Factor makeup studio. The Hollywood Regency style building was designed by S. Charles Lee and built in 1935. The Mel's Drive-In at 1670 Lincoln Blvd. in Santa Monica, California was built as The Penguin in 1958. The googie style building was designed by Armet & Davis.

Protest

In October 1963, the Mel's Drive-In chain was picketed and subjected to a sit-in by the Ad Hoc Committee to End Discrimination over the fact that while the restaurant would serve food to African Americans and hired them as cooks, they were not allowed to work “up front” where they could be seen by white customers. More than 100 protesters were arrested. The picketing ended when Harold Dobbs, a San Francisco City supervisor who had run for mayor and lost, settled with the protesters and began to allow black workers up front.

In popular culture

In 1972, the restaurant was selected as a feature location by George Lucas for his 1973 film American Graffiti. The Mel's used was located at 140 South Van Ness Avenue in San Francisco. It serves as the setting for the opening scene of the film as well as the backdrop for the opening credits, accompanied on the soundtrack by Bill Haley’s “Rock Around the Clock”.

The prominent play given to the location has been credited with having saved the company from possibly going out of business. Signage and artwork from the Mel's chain is frequently used in marketing for the film.

Universal Studios built a replica of Mel's Drive-In on its lot, pursuant to the restaurant being used in American Graffiti – this amusement attraction also served as a gift shop for years.

Prior to American Graffiti, Mel's was used as a location in the 1967 film Guess Who's Coming to Dinner. Spencer Tracy and Katharine Hepburn are out for a drive, and Tracy pulls into Mel's and orders Oregon boysenberry ice cream; he then has a minor traffic altercation with a black man. The Mel's was located in the Excelsior district of San Francisco. Hepburn and Tracy never actually visited the location.

Mel's restaurants have since been featured in other media, such as Melrose Place (1996, Season 5, Episode 1), Doonesbury comics (December 18, 1989), and the book The American Drive-in by Mike Witzel.

The address for the Mel's Drive-In location on Sunset Boulevard in West Hollywood is listed at the bottom of the signed headshots found in the VIP packages for the band Ghost's "A Pale Tour Named Death".

Gallery

References

  (previously published in 1986 as Googie: Fifties Coffee Shop Architecture )

External links

 Original Mels official website
 Mels Drive-In official website
 Original Mels and Mels Drive-in Article
 Mel's Drive-in: The True Story of the World's Most Famous Drive-in Pt.1 Article

Restaurants in San Francisco
Restaurants in Los Angeles
Fast-food chains of the United States
Regional restaurant chains in the United States
Restaurants established in 1947
1947 establishments in California
Theme restaurants
Drive-in restaurants
Modernist architecture in California
Googie architecture in California
Googie architecture
Commercial buildings in Los Angeles